Al-Jarba is a Syrian village located in Markaz Rif Dimashq, Rif Dimashq to the east of the Al-Nashabiyah nahiyah ("subdistrict"). According to the Syria Central Bureau of Statistics (CBS), Al-Jarba had a population of 2,172 in the 2004 census.

References 

Populated places in Markaz Rif Dimashq District